Brian Bonner may refer to:
 Brian Bonner (racing driver) (born 1959),American driver in the CART Championship Car series
 Brian Bonner (linebacker) (born 1965), former American football linebacker in the National Football League for the San Francisco 49ers and the Washington Redskins
 Brian Bonner (safety) (born 1984), Canadian football safety who playing for the Edmonton Eskimos